Dyschirius exochus is a species of ground beetle in the subfamily Scaritinae. It was described by Whitehead in 1970.

References

exochus
Beetles described in 1970